Alexander "Alex" William Gordey was a provincial politician from Alberta, Canada. He served as a member of the Legislative Assembly of Alberta from 1959 to 1971 sitting with the Social Credit caucus in government.

Political career
Gordey ran for a seat to the Alberta Legislature in the 1959 Alberta general election in the electoral district of Vegreville as the Social Credit candidate. Gordey defeated incumbent Stanley Ruzycki and two other candidates by a large margin to pick up the seat for his party.

The 1963 boundary redistribution redistributed Gordey's riding, the riding became Vegreville-Bruce. Gordey ran for a second term in office in the new district for the election held that year. He faced four other candidates and won taking just over half of the popular vote.

Gordey ran for a third term in office in the 1967 Alberta general election. He faced a strong challenge from Progressive Conservative candidate Mike Kawulych but managed to hold his seat.

The 1971 boundary redistribution altered Vegreville-Bruce to once again become the riding of Vegreville. Gordey ran for his fourth term in the 1971 Alberta general election but was defeated by Progressive Conservative candidate John Batiuk.

References

External links
Legislative Assembly of Alberta Members Listing

Alberta Social Credit Party MLAs
1912 births
1983 deaths